Eamon Christopher McKinley "Ginge" Fullen  is a British mountaineer and former Royal Navy clearance diver who holds the Guinness World Records for the fastest climbs of every peak in Europe and Africa.

Life
Fullen was a clearance diver in the Royal Navy for twenty years. He broke his neck in 1990 while playing rugby and suffered a heart attack on Mount Everest in 1996.

Achievements
Fullen has climbed 168 country high points. He was awarded the Queen's Gallantry Medal in the 1988 New Year Honours for saving lives during the 1987  ferry disaster whilst serving in the Royal Navy.

See also 
 Tibesti Mountains
 Saka Haphong

References

External links
 Guinness World Records
 Archived website - gingefullen.com - web archive
 Greatest Modern Day Adventurers
 A Few breaths from death, Everest 1996 - Self account of Ginge Fullen (DOC File)
 Trapped on Everest? I'm on my mobile by Stephen Goodwin, Independent UK
 The Storms: Adventure and tragedy on Everest by Mike Trueman, Google Books.

Living people
British mountain climbers
Sports world record holders
Year of birth missing (living people)
Place of birth missing (living people)